L'Argent des autres (Other People's Money) is a 1978 French drama film directed by Christian de Chalonge, and starring Jean-Louis Trintignant, Catherine Deneuve, Claude Brasseur and Michel Serrault. It won the Louis Delluc Prize and the César Award for Best Film and Best Director, and was nominated for Best Supporting Actor, Best Writing and Best Editing.

Plot 
Henri Rainier is a senior manager at the Miremant bank. He makes loans to an adventurous client, the Chevalier d'Aven, knowing that he has the backing of his superiors. However, the relationship proves financially disastrous, and the bank is faced with having to cover up its massive deficit. 

The bank's directors want to disassociate themselves from the scandal and, as Rainier's client is now accused of fraud, they hold him responsible and fire him on the spot. However, Rainier refuses to take it lying down, knowing that the bank's directors approved every loan. His wife Cécile and the union representative Arlette suggest he sue his former employers. Determined not to be the scapegoat, and anxious to avoid possible criminal charges, Rainier sets out to prove the bank's responsibility for this and other shady transactions.

But a senior bank manager who has been sacked is, he finds, unemployable. And even though he breaks into the bank's archives to find incriminating evidence, nobody believes a disgruntled ex-employee. The Chevalier d'Aven gets five years in prison and the bank is exonerated in the eyes of the world, having been the innocent victim of a cunning crook and an incompetent manager. Since everybody agrees that Rainier could conduct a perfect business lunch, he ends up training young hopefuls in this subtle art.

Cast 
 Jean-Louis Trintignant as Henri Rainier
 Catherine Deneuve as Cécile Rainier
 Claude Brasseur as Claude Chevalier d'Aven
 Michel Serrault as Miremant
 Gérard Séty as De Nully
 Jean Leuvrais as Heldorff
 François Perrot as Vincent
 Umberto Orsini as Blue
 Michel Berto as Duval
 Francis Lemaire as Torrent
 Juliet Berto as Arlette Rivière
 Raymond Bussières as Claude Chevalier d'Aven's father

References

External links 
 
 

1978 films
French drama films
1970s French-language films
Best Film César Award winners
Films whose director won the Best Director César Award
Films directed by Christian de Chalonge
Trading films
Louis Delluc Prize winners
1970s business films
1970s French films